Norman Grey Riddell MM (1887 – 15 June 1918) was an English professional footballer who played as a left back in the Football League for Clapton Orient.

Personal life 
Prior to the First World War, Riddell worked for the North Eastern Railway. He served as a colour sergeant in the Northumberland Fusiliers during the First World War. In December 1917, Riddell was awarded the Military Medal "for having rallied and led his men after his sergeants and corporals had become casualties and subsequently dealt with an enemy sniper who was causing heavy casualties during the advance". Riddell was killed in Italy on 15 June 1918 and was buried in Magnaboschi British Cemetery, Asiago plateau.

Honours 

 Lancashire Combination First Division: 1910–11

References

1887 births
1918 deaths
People from Morpeth, Northumberland
Footballers from Northumberland
English footballers
Association football fullbacks
Blyth Spartans A.F.C. players
Morpeth Harriers F.C. players
Rochdale A.F.C. players
Leyton Orient F.C. players
Rossendale United F.C. players
English Football League players
Military personnel from Northumberland
British Army personnel of World War I
Royal Northumberland Fusiliers soldiers
British military personnel killed in World War I
Recipients of the Military Medal
Burials in Italy